Piergiorgio Bertoldi (born 26 July 1963) is a Catholic archbishop and Apostolic Nuncio of the Holy See.

Biography
He was born in Varese, capital of the Province of Varese, on 26 July 1963.  
He received his priestly ordination by cardinal Carlo Maria Martini on 11 June 1988 for the Archdiocese of Milan. 
He attended the Pontifical Ecclesiastical Academy and entered the diplomatic service of the Holy See. He then worked for the diplomatic missions of the Holy See in Uganda, Republic of Congo, Colombia, the former Yugoslavia, Romania, Iran, Brasil.

On 24 April 2015 Pope Francis appointed him titular archbishop of Spello and apostolic nuncio to Burkina Faso and Niger. His episcopal consecration took place on 2 June 2015 in Venegono Inferiore.

On 19 March 2019 Pope Francis appointed him as the apostolic nuncio to Mozambique.

See also
 List of heads of the diplomatic missions of the Holy See

References

External links
 catholic-hierarchy.org 

21st-century Italian Roman Catholic titular archbishops
1963 births
Living people
Apostolic Nuncios to Mozambique
Apostolic Nuncios to Niger
Apostolic Nuncios to Burkina Faso
People from Varese